The Berw Fault is a SW-NE trending fault in North Wales. It forms part of the Menai Strait Fault System, with the Dinorwic Fault and the Aber Dinlle Fault. It has a long history of movement with early ductile fabrics preserved from a sinistral (left lateral) strike-slip sense shear zone active at the end of the Precambrian and into the early Cambrian. Any Caledonian deformation is unclear but the fault zone was reactivated in the Carboniferous as a NW-throwing normal fault with seismic reflection data showing the formation of a half-graben in its hanging wall. There are no indications of inversion during the Variscan Orogeny, but the fault was reactivated in a normal sense during the Permian and Triassic and again during the Cenozoic with a sinistral strike-slip sense.

See also
List of geological faults of Wales

References

Geology of Gwynedd